The   was a Japanese domain of the Edo period. It was associated with Higo Province in modern-day Kumamoto Prefecture.

In the han system, Hitoyoshi was a political and economic abstraction based on periodic cadastral surveys and projected agricultural yields.  In other words, the domain was defined in terms of kokudaka, not land area. This was different from the feudalism of the West.

History
The Sagara clan was established at Hitoyoshi in the 13th century; and they stayed in the same place until the Meiji Restoration.

List of daimyōs 
The hereditary daimyōs were head of the clan and head of the domain.

Sagara clan (tozama; 22,000 koku)
Yorifusa
Yorihiro
Yoritaka
Yoritomi
Nagaoki
Nagaari
Yorimine
Yorihisa
Akinaga
Yorisada
Tomimochi
Nagahiro
Yorinori
Yoriyuki
Nagatomi
Yorimoto

See also 
 List of Han
 Abolition of the han system

References

External links
  "Hitoyoshi" at Edo 300 

Domains of Japan